Willi Messner (born 14 March 1940) is a retired East German swimmer. In 1964, he won a national title in the 200 m breaststroke and was selected for the 1964 Summer Olympics, but failed to reach the final.

References

1940 births
Living people
German male swimmers
Sportspeople from Gelsenkirchen
German male breaststroke swimmers
Olympic swimmers of the United Team of Germany
Swimmers at the 1964 Summer Olympics
20th-century German people